Carneiros is a municipality located in the western of the Brazilian state of Alagoas. Its population is 9.159 (2020) and its area is 113 km².

References

Municipalities in Alagoas